George Brinton McClellan Rooks  (born George Brinton Mc Clellan Ruckser; October 21, 1863 – March 11, 1935), was a Major League Baseball outfielder. He played for the  Boston Beaneaters of the National League in five games during the 1891 baseball season.

References

External links

1863 births
1935 deaths
Major League Baseball outfielders
Boston Beaneaters players
Baseball players from Chicago
19th-century baseball players
Lincoln Tree Planters players
LaCrosse Freezers players
Lima Lushers players
Chicago Maroons players
Detroit Wolverines (minor league) players
Buffalo Bisons (minor league) players
Evansville Hoosiers players
Grand Rapids Shamrocks players
Ishpeming-Nagaunee Unions players
Saginaw Alerts players
Marquette Undertakers players